Anup Rubens, born Enoch Rubens, is an Indian film music composer who predominantly works in Telugu cinema. He has received the South Filmfare Awards and Nandhi Awards by Government of Andra pradesh.

Rubens works include Seetharama Kalyana (2018), Geetha (2019), Neneraju nenemanthri (2017), Katamarayudu (2017), Gopala Gopala (2015), Temper (2015), Gowtam SSC (2005), Prema Kavali (2011), Ishq (2012), Sukumarudu (2013), Loukyam (2014), and Manam (2014).

Discography

As composer

Music videos

Awards and nominations 
Nandi Award for Best Music Director - Manam
Filmfare Award for Best Music Director - Telugu  - Manam
Santosham Best Music Director Award  -  Manam

References

External Links

Telugu film score composers
Filmfare Awards South winners
Telugu playback singers
Living people
1983 births
People from Telangana
Indian male film score composers
Santosham Film Awards winners